Comedy Bang! Bang! is a television series created and hosted by Scott Aukerman that aired weekly on IFC.  The show is a spin-off of his podcast Comedy Bang! Bang! which airs on the Earwolf network. Like the podcast, the series features outlandish and farcical humor, often delivered in a deadpan manner. The show stars Scott Aukerman playing a fictional version of himself.

The following is a complete list of Comedy Bang! Bang! episodes.

Series overview

Episodes

Season 1 (2012)

Season 2 (2013)

Season 3 (2014)
On October 14, 2013, the show was renewed for a 20-episode third season, which premiered on May 8, 2014.

Season 4 (2015)
The show was renewed for a 40-episode fourth season which premiered on 9 January 2015.

Season 5 (2016)
On May 5, 2015, the series was renewed for a 20-episode fifth season, which premiered on June 3, 2016.

References

External links
 

Comedy Bang Bang